WRX, or wrx, is a three-letter abbreviation that may refer to:

 FIA World Rallycross Championship
 GB-WRX, the ISO 3166-2:GB code for Wrexham (county borough) in Wales, UK
 Subaru Impreza WRX (World Rally eXperimental) (1992–2014)
 Subaru WRX (World Rally eXperimental) (2014–present)
 Western Refrigerator Line (from its reporting mark)
 wrx, the ISO 639-3 code for the Wae Rana language of Flores, Indonesia
 WRX, the National Rail code for Wrexham General railway station in Wales, UK

See also